Madhukar Dattatraya Deoras (11 December 1915 – 17 June 1996), popularly known as Balasaheb Deoras, was the third Sarsanghchalak of the Rashtriya Swayamsevak Sangh (RSS).

Biography
Deoras was born in a Telugu-speaking Deshastha Rigvedi Brahmin (DRB) family on 11 December 1915 in Nagpur and raised in Andhra Pradesh. He was the eighth child of Dattatreya Krishnarao Deoras and Parvati-bai; the ninth child, his younger brother Bhaurao Deoras (Murlidhar alias Bhaurao), also became a pracharak of the RSS. During Balasaheb Deoras's tenure as RSS chief, Bhaurao Deoras played a key role in the organization in North India. Balasaheb Deoras was a student at New English High School. He graduated from Morris College in Nagpur in 1938 and obtained his LLB degree at the College of Law, Nagpur University. Inspired by Dr. K. B. Hedgewar, he was associated with the RSS from its inception and decided to dedicate his life to its goals.

He was the first pracharak sent to Bengal, and he returned to the movement's headquarters to direct the publication of Tarun Bharat, a Marathi daily, and Yugadharma, a Hindi daily. Deoras brothers wanted RSS to be more activist, and they withdrew from the organization from 1953 to 1957 because of dissatisfaction with Golwalkar's more insular policies. But they kept in touch and the brothers resumed working for RSS in 1957 upon Golwalkar's suggestion. Balasaheb Deoras became general secretary of the RSS in 1965. During the same year he addressed the annual meeting of the Jana Sangh. After the death of second RSS chief M. S. Golwalkar, Deoras became Sarsanghachalak, the leader of the RSS, in 1973. Deoras chose to involve RSS more deeply in social activism than any other past RSS sarsanghachalak. The following year, Deoras expressed his activist leanings by having the RSS support the "JP Movement", an anti-Indira Gandhi movement led by Jayaprakash Narayan. There are also accounts, disputed by RSS spokesmen, of Balasaheb Deoras apologising to Indira Gandhi, while being incarcerated at Yerwada jail,  and offering support to her twenty point programme if the ban on RSS was lifted.

In the aftermath of the end of The Emergency, Deoras met with Christian and Muslim leaders. The RSS’s national assembly exhorted, "all citizens in general and R.S.S. Swayamsevaks in particular to further expedite this process of mutual contact by participation in each other’s social functions". Such sentiments can be viewed as consequences of the optimism in Indian public culture at that time. Under Deoras, the RSS took a turn towards accelerated activism and tried to dramatically increase the number and range of its recruits. This shift in orientation was reflected in its literature: it produced simplified versions of its ideology and used new generic forms to present them in (comic books, posters, postcards, inland letter cards, etc.). The term "the masses" came to occupy a central place in its vocabulary.

Deoras continued as Sarsanghachalak till 1994, when he stepped down due to ill health. He left behind a shining legacy and paved the way for Rajendra Singh to replace him. Declining health eventually resulted in his death on 17 June 1996. He lived long enough to see Atal Bihari Vajpayee become India's Prime Minister in May 1996, the first adherent of Hindutva philosophy and of RSS affiliation to become PM.

Views of Deoras
Deoras echoed Savarkar by stating: "We do believe in the one-culture and one-nation Hindu rashtra. But our definition of Hindu is not limited to any particular kind of faith. Our definition of Hindu includes those who believe in the one-culture and one-nation theory of this country. They can all form part of the Hindu-rashtra. So by Hindu we do not mean any particular type of faith. We use the word Hindu in a broader sense." According to Deoras, even though Mahatma Gandhi appeased Muslims, the Muslims never accepted him as one of their own.

In one of the most important speeches delivered in the history of RSS from the platform of Vasant Vyakhyanmala (Spring Lecture Series), Deoras denounced the practice of untouchability in May 1974 in Pune, and appealed to the RSS volunteers to work towards its removal from the Hindu society. The RSS has set up many programs under Seva Bharati, an organization devoted to uplifting the members of scheduled castes. Under it, RSS volunteers have started schools in which they offer vocational courses for slum dwellers and former untouchables while teaching them the virtues of Hinduism. Deoras declared: "If untouchability is not wrong, nothing in the world is wrong." He said on 9 November 1985, that the main purpose of the RSS is Hindu unity and that the organization believes all citizens of India should have a 'Hindu culture'.

A brainchild of Deoras, the Swadeshi Jagaran Manch was vocal in its defense of swadeshi. Founded in 1993, it was conceived as a protectionist bulwark against economic liberalization by the Congress government of P.V. Narasimha Rao in 1991.

Books by Deoras
Deoras wrote in both English and Hindi. Some of books he authored:

 Punjab, problem and its solution (1984)
 Social equality and Hindu consolidation (1974)
 Hindu sangathana aura sattavadi rajaniti (1997)
 Sri Balasaheb Deoras answers questions (1984)
 Rouse: The power of good (1975)

Notes

References

Books

Citations

External links

People from Nagpur
Rashtriya Swayamsevak Sangh pracharaks
1915 births
1996 deaths
Indians imprisoned during the Emergency (India)
20th-century Indian politicians
Sarsanghchalaks
Indian Hindus
Hindu nationalists
20th-century Hindu philosophers and theologians
Prisoners and detainees of Maharashtra